eXpressDSP is a software package produced by Texas Instruments (TI). This software package is a suite of tools used to develop applications on Texas Instruments digital signal processor line of chips.

It consists of:
 An integrated development environment called Code Composer Studio IDE.
 DSP/BIOS Real-Time OS kernel
 Standards for application interoperability and reuse
 Code examples for common applications, called the eXpressDSP Reference Frameworks
 A number of third-party products from TI's DSP Third Party Program

eXpressDSP Algorithm Interface Standard
TI publishes an eXpressDSP Algorithm Interface Standard (XDAIS), an Application Programming Interface (API) designed to enable interoperability of real-time DSP algorithms.

References
 About eXpressDSP Software
 eXpressDSP Algorithm Interface Standard
Dorsch, Jeff, "TI Unveils DSP Software Environment - eXpressDSP Real-Time application development software - Product Announcement," Electronic News, Sept. 20, 1999.

Texas Instruments
Digital signal processing